This article lists events that occurred during 1982 in Estonia.

Incumbents

Events
Construction of Muuga Harbour was started.
Tartu University celebrated its 350th anniversary.

Births

Deaths

References

 
1980s in Estonia
Estonia
Estonia
Years of the 20th century in Estonia